World Series of Fighting 3: Fitch vs. Burkman was a mixed martial arts event held on  in Las Vegas.

Background

Tyrone Spong was scheduled to make his second appearance for the promotion at this event in a match against Angel DeAnda.  However, on May 1, it was announced that he had been pulled from the card due to visa issues.

A match between Rolles Gracie and Dave Huckaba was supposed to be on the main card, but Gracie was forced out due to injury and the fight was cancelled.

Jeff Smith also replaced an injured Chris Greutzemacher on the preliminary card.

Results

See also
 List of WSOF champions
 List of WSOF events

References

Events in Paradise, Nevada
World Series of Fighting events
2013 in mixed martial arts
2013 in sports in Nevada
Hard Rock Hotel and Casino (Las Vegas)